Lily of Killarney is a 1934 British musical film directed by Maurice Elvey and starring John Garrick, Gina Malo and Leslie Perrins. The film was made at Twickenham Studios. It is based on the play The Colleen Bawn by the Irish writer Dion Boucicault. The film's sets were designed by the art director James A. Carter.

Plot
In Ireland a poor aristocrat hires a half-wit to drown his secret wife so he can wed an heiress.

Cast
 John Garrick as Sir Patrick Cregeen  
 Gina Malo as Eileen O'Connor  
 Leslie Perrins as Sir James Corrigan  
 Dennis Hoey as Myles-Na-Coppaleen  
 Stanley Holloway as Father O'Flynn  
 Sara Allgood as Mrs. O'Connor  
 D.J. Williams as Danny Mann  
 Hughes Macklin as Shan, the shepherd  
 John Mortimer as Tim O'Brien  
 Dorothy Boyd as Norah Cregeen 
 Pat Noonan as Chief Constable James Collins  
 A. Bromley Davenport as Lord Kenmore  
 Pat Williams 
 Percy Honri
 Pamela May as Ann Chute

References

Bibliography
 Low, Rachael. Filmmaking in 1930s Britain. George Allen & Unwin, 1985.
 Wood, Linda. British Films, 1927-1939. British Film Institute, 1986.

External links

1934 films
British musical films
1934 musical films
1930s English-language films
Films shot at Twickenham Film Studios
Films directed by Maurice Elvey
Films set in Ireland
British black-and-white films
1930s British films